The Man Without a Country is an opera in 2 acts by composer Walter Damrosch. Arthur Guiterman wrote the English language libretto which was based on Edward Everett Hale's 1863 short story of the same name. The work premiered at the Metropolitan Opera in New York City on May 12, 1937.

Roles

References

Operas
1937 operas
English-language operas
Operas by Walter Damrosch
Opera world premieres at the Metropolitan Opera
Operas set in the United States